George Beardoe Grundy (10 January 1861, Wallasey – 6 December 1948, Oxford) was an English historian, specializing in the military history of ancient Greece and Rome.

Grundy was educated at Risley School and then at Lichfield Grammar School. He began teaching at age 16. At age 27 he matriculated at Brasenose College, Oxford, and received in 1892 the title of "Geographical Student of the University of Oxford", becoming a lecturer on ancient geography. He was from 1897 to 1903 a lecturer for professor of ancient history at Oxford, from 1903 to 1931 a fellow and tutor of ancient history at Corpus Christi College, Oxford, and from 1904 to 1917 a tutor in ancient history at Brasenose College, Oxford. He was in 1899 proxime accessit for the Arnold Historical Essay with a paper on Roman Dacia and in 1900 received the Conington Prize.

Selected publications

References

1861 births
1948 deaths
People from Wallasey
British classical scholars
Alumni of Brasenose College, Oxford
Fellows of Corpus Christi College, Oxford
Classical scholars of the University of Oxford
Historians of antiquity